Thomasia dielsii is a species of flowering plant in the family Malvaceae and is endemic to the south-west of Western Australia. It is a low, erect to spreading shrub with egg-shaped leaves with wavy edges, and purple, violet and blue flowers.

Description
The edges of the leaves are wavy and slightly serrated, the upper surface with a few star-shaped hairs, the lower surface more densely hairy. There are hairy, smaller leaf-like stipules at the base of the petioles.

Taxonomy and naming
Thomasia dielsii was first formally described in 1904 by Ernst Georg Pritzel in Botanische Jahrbücher für Systematik, Pflanzengeschichte und Pflanzengeographie from specimens he collected near Cranbrook. The specific epithet (dielsii) honours Ludwig Diels.

Distribution and habitat
This thomasia grows on flats from near Cranbrook to Israelite Bay in the Avon Wheatbelt, Esperance Plains and Jarrah Forest bioregions of south-western Western Australia.

Conservation status
Thomasia dielsii is classified as "Priority One" by the Government of Western Australia Department of Biodiversity, Conservation and Attractions, meaning that it is known from only one or a few locations which are potentially at risk.

References

Rosids of Western Australia
Plants described in 1904
dielsii
Taxa named by Ernst Pritzel